Karmalink is a 2021 Cambodian science fiction film written and directed by Jake Wachtel in his directorial debut, and produced by Valerie Steinberg. It is the first science-fiction film from Cambodia. It stars Leng Heng Prak and Srey Leak Chhith in their acting debuts, who also worked with Wachtel and co-writer Christopher Larsen on developing the story and translating it into Khmer. The film is dedicated to lead actor Leng Heng Prak, who died before its completion.

Synopsis 
In a near future Phnom Penh, a community is threatened with eviction to make way for a bullet train service to China. The wealthy use nanotechnology to "augment" their experiences. At night, Leng Heng dreams of his previous lives and of a solid gold Buddha, which he is convinced will help prevent his family from being evicted. He and orphan street child Srey Leak begin a search for the Buddha in the hope it will protect their community.

Production and release 

Wachtel, an American, wrote and directed the film after moving to Cambodia in 2014 and working with local students as part of Filmmakers Without Borders. Inspired by Kazuo Ishiguro's novel Never Let Me Go, Wachtel devised a science fiction story set in Phnom Penh in the near future. Two of Wachtel's students, Leng Heng Prak and Srey Leak Chhith, were the inspiration for the main characters. They were later cast in the film to play them. The film is mostly set in the Tralop Bek district of Phnom Penh, where both actors grew up. 

The film's themes draw on Buddhist concepts of karma and rebirth, as well as artificial intelligence and economic inequality. Wachtel spent several years honing the script, working with Cambodian friends and colleagues to ensure local culture was adequately reflected. The displacement of 4,000 families around Boeung Kak also served as inspiration for the story. The film was primarily shot in Phnom Penh over 37 days. Shooting locations include Phnom Penh's Royal railway station and Olympic Stadium.

During the film's editing, lead actor Leng Heng Prak died. The film is dedicated to his memory. 

The film had its world premiere as the opening night film of the 2021 Venice Film Festival's Critics' Week, and it also screened at many other festivals including the Austin Film Festival, Singapore International Film Festival, Santa Fe International Film Festival, Sun Valley Film Festival, and Glasgow Film Festival. The film had a theatrical release in the United States on July 15, 2022, and it was released in Cambodia on February 17, 2023.

Reception 
  

Richard Kuipers gave the film a positive review in Variety, praising its unique filming location, themes, musical score and performances. In Screen Rant, Nadir Samara commended the cinematography and unique production design, but critiqued the dialogue and execution of its themes, concluding that the film was "beautifully imperfect". Wendy Ide in Screen Daily also praised the film's worldbuilding and the central performances from its nonprofessional actors, concluding that "While the first two acts are more engaging and accessible than the third – the picture does get a little bogged down in its effects and ideas – there’s no question that this is an imaginative and original debut from director Jake Wachtel."

References

External links

 Karmalink at Metacritic

 Karmalink at Mubi
2023 science fiction films
Cambodian speculative fiction films
2023 directorial debut films
Khmer-language films
Films about Buddhism
Films set in Cambodia
Films shot in Cambodia
Films about artificial intelligence
Films about social class
Religious science fiction films